Chloreuptychia is a genus of satyrid butterfly found in the Neotropical realm.

Species
Listed alphabetically:
Chloreuptychia agatha (Butler, 1867)
Chloreuptychia callichloris (Butler, 1867)
Chloreuptychia catharina (Staudinger, [1886])
Chloreuptychia chlorimene (Hübner, [1819])
Chloreuptychia herseis (Godart, [1824])
Chloreuptychia hewitsonii (Butler, 1867)
Chloreuptychia marica (Weymer, 1911)
Chloreuptychia sericeella (Bates, 1865)
Chloreuptychia tolumnia (Cramer, 1777)

Gallery

References

Euptychiina
Nymphalidae of South America
Butterfly genera
Taxa named by Walter Forster (entomologist)